Scott Pethybridge (born 25 June 1977) is an Australian former professional rugby league footballer who played for four clubs over his career. Pethybridge mainly played on the wing; although, he was somewhat of a utility back. His father, Gary, played rugby league in the 1970s. His uncle Rod also played professional rugby league.

Playing career
Pethybridge was 17 years old when he made his debut in the NSWRL Premiership, for the Penrith Panthers. Pethybridge went on to play thirty-four games for the Panthers before leaving during the Super League war.

In 1996, he was part of the Junior Kangaroos tour of Fiji. After deciding to align himself with the Australian Rugby League, Scott joined the North Sydney Bears. He played 55 games for the club and was a regular in the side. However, when the Bears merged with the Manly Warringah Sea Eagles at the end of 1999, Pethybridge was not selected to be part of the new combined squad. Pethybridge was a member of the North Sydney side which played its final first grade game against The North Queensland Cowboys in Townsville.

This left him searching for a new club, and he ended up joining the Auckland Warriors for the 2000 season. He returned to Australia in 2001, where he played five games over the next two years for the Northern Eagles before retiring.

Post playing
Pethybridge is now involved in horse racing.

References

1977 births
Living people
Penrith Panthers players
North Sydney Bears players
New Zealand Warriors players
Northern Eagles players
Rugby league wingers
Rugby league players from Sydney